Krivoye is a rural locality (a village) in Kubenskoye Rural Settlement, Vologodsky District, Vologda Oblast, Russia. The population was 21 as of 2002.

Geography 
Krivoye is located 68 km northwest of Vologda (the district's administrative centre) by road. Dulovo is the nearest rural locality.

References 

Rural localities in Vologodsky District